We Are the Giant is a 2014 American documentary film produced and directed by Greg Barker. The film had its world premiere at 2014 Sundance Film Festival on January 18, 2014.

The film is scheduled for a limited theatrical run from October 30, 2014 in UK. A special screening and panel Q&A will also take place at London's BFI cinema on the October 30, 2014.

Synopsis
The film narrates the  stories of ordinary individuals who are transformed by the critical moral and personal challenges they encounter when standing up for what they believe is right.

Reception
We Are the Giant received positive reviews from critics. Dennis Harvey of Variety, said in his review that "Despite its harrowing on-the-ground footage, Greg Barker's Arab Spring documentary risks pretentiousness." Boyd van Hoeij in his review for The Hollywood Reporter praised the film by writing that "A slickly assembled and insightful documentary that looks at three individual stories from the Arab Spring." Robert Cameron Fowler of Indiewire grade the film A by writing that ""We Are the Giant” is both vital and devastating, with raw material conveyed through elegant construction. Barker asks the hard questions, issuing the frightening possibly of necessary violence when pacifism yields no results." Brent Simon  in his review for Paste Magazine said that "The clarion call of a grander moral calling anchors the documentary We Are the Giant, and in large part saves it from its own overstuffed passion."

References

External links
 Official website
 
 

2014 films
2014 documentary films
American documentary films
Documentary films about the Arab Spring
Films directed by Greg Barker
Films produced by John Battsek
2010s English-language films
2010s American films